Rossini's Ghost is a 1996 HBO Original Film produced and directed by David Devine, with co-production by Richard Mozer.

Plot

The story centers around Gioachino Rossini, a composer whose friends never lose faith in him—even when things go wrong. A 9-year-old girl travels back in time through a magic mirror to be his invisible assistant, overcoming the disastrous opening night of The Barber of Seville to give the world one of its most beloved operas.

Cast

 Joseph Di Mambro (actor) as Gioachino Rossini
 Melissa Pirerra as Relania
 Frances Bay as Elder Rosalie
 Margaret Illmann as Young Rosalie
 Janne Mortil as Young Martina
 Lally Cadeau as Elder Martina
 Tony Nardi as Duke Cesarini

Production

The film was shot in the small mountain town of Labin, in Istria, Croatia.

The film was released on DVD and has been watched in over 100 countries on television. The film and its corresponding Teacher's Guide is used in numerous U.S. elementary and middle schools by music teachers for music classes.  Rossini's Ghost was the seventh of seven films made for HBO for the 7- to 14-year-old set, introducing them to the joys and the wonders of classical music and their composers.

Soundtrack

The CD and soundtrack, produced by David Devine for Sony MUSIC of New York, was composed by Gioachino Rossini, and was recorded at the Slovak Philharmonic Orchestra, with an 88-person symphony orchestra conducted by Ondrej Lenárd.

 Overture to Il barbiere di Siviglia (The Barber of Seville) – 7:29
 Overture to La scala di seta (The Silken Ladder) - 6:37
 Overture to L'italiana in Algeri (The Italian Girl in Algiers) - 8:35
 Overture to Semiramide - 13:11
 Overture to Il signor Bruschino - 04:55
 Overture to La cenerentola (Cinderella) - 8:30
 Overture to La gazza ladra (The Thieving Magpie) - 10:17
 Overture to Guillaume Tell (William Tell Overture) - 11:42

References

External links
 
 Devine Entertainment's Web site

1996 films
1996 drama films
Films set in Italy
Films set in the 1810s
Films set in the 1860s
Films about classical music and musicians
Films about composers
Films shot in Croatia
American drama films
Gioachino Rossini
1990s English-language films
1990s American films